Egidio Falcetta de Cingulo (died 1564) was a Roman Catholic prelate who served as Bishop of Bertinoro (1542–1564) and Bishop of Caorle (1538–1542).

Biography
On 15 March 1542, Sebastiano Rossi was appointed during the papacy of Pope Paul III as Bishop of Caorle.
On 30 January 1563, he was appointed during the papacy of Pope Pius IV as Bishop of Bertinoro.
He served as Bishop of Bertinoro until his death in 1564.

References

External links and additional sources
 (for Chronology of Bishops) 
 (for Chronology of Bishops) 
 (for Chronology of Bishops) 
 (for Chronology of Bishops) 

16th-century Italian Roman Catholic bishops
Bishops appointed by Pope Paul III
Bishops appointed by Pope Pius IV
1564 deaths